Private stamps have been issued in Uruguay by (private) companies instead of the national postal administrations. These stamps were only intended for usage for local inland delivery and were unrecognised by the UPU. The postal services organised by the stagecoach companies, led by Mr. Lapido, started issuing stamps in 1856. These first private stamps came to be known as the Diligencia issue. A second issue, the so-called Soles de Montevideo, followed in 1859.

This is a survey of the private stamp issues of Uruguay.

1856 Diligencia
On October 1, 1856, the so-called Diligencia (stagecoach stamp) was issued by the stagecoach companies. This issue was intended for correspondence carried by stagecoach, solely for the domestic service. There were three values:
 60 centésimos blue, for single page letters
 80 centésimos green, for two-page letters
 1 real red, for three-page letters.
The stamps were issued in sheets of 35, printed on white woven unwatermarked paper, in the Mège Lithograph Workshop of Mège y Willems Printing Ltd in Montevideo. The set was redrawn on 1 October 1857.

Postal weights
The tariffs for correspondence were regulated both by weight and travel distance. This last variable was abandoned when the rates approved in May 1856 became official.

 6 adarmes = 1 ounce = 28.7 grams
 1 pound = 454 grams

The postage could be paid by the sender or by the recipient when the correspondence reached its
destination.

Stage Coaches and Diligencia
Part of article written in 1911 by Micheloni regarding the Diligencias of Uruguay.

The first stamps appeared in 1856. Up to this time the postal administration of Uruguay did not think it necessary to introduce the useful invention of Rowland Hill. It is true that at that period correspondence was of slight importance, particularly going out of the country. Very few sailing vessels made the voyage between Montevideo and Europe. Correspondence in the interior was effected by means of the diligencias,  which were a kind of omnibus or mail coach, charged not only with the forwarding of correspondence but also travellers and their baggage. The lucky inhabitants of the United States, who travel so luxuriously in splendid Pullman cars, cannot easily imagine the quality of comfort which was experienced by the passengers in these famous diligencias. Picture to yourself a large omnibus with room for ten inside and three more beside the Mayoral, as the driver of the equipage was called. The team was made up of six horses, ranged in a triangle: three next the coach, two preceding these and finally the sixth one leading, which was generally ridden by another driver like a postillion. Beside the diligencia rode another man on horseback whose sole function was to stimulate the ardor of the coach horses by an abundant application of the whip.

A journey in the diligencia might be tolerable in the spring, particularly when the fresh air of the country fills the lungs of the chivalrous gauchos with the fragrance of the pampa; but during the high temperature of the southern summer or the "dog-days," I assure you that it could not have been very enjoy able; and there is reason to believe that those who had to make long journeys, particularly during the afternoon hours, must heartily have envied the inhabitants of Siberia.

The service given by the diligencias was naturally very irregular and could hardly help being so. Sometimes floods on the numerous rivers which traverse the country would carry away the balsa, a kind of wooden raft used for ferrying, and the coach would be unable to proceed; sometimes, because of rains or the roughness of the roads, the coach would upset and the passengers would have to lend a hand to the mayoral in order to right it, if they wished to continue the journey.

At that period, therefore, communication was carried on by means of these mail coaches, and the name DILIGENCIA printed at the top of the first stamps of Uruguay indicates that the mail was sent from Montevideo to the other cities of the country by them. These stamps were used solely for the domestic service.

19th Century controversy
Don Anselmo Seijó was a renowned collector at the end of the 19th and early 20th century. His most important grant to the philately of Uruguay was the find of the “Piñeiro Archive”. In the 19th century a controversy arose concerning the genuineness of the Diligencia second type issue. The Belgian dealer Jean-Baptiste Moens, supported by other chroniclers in Europe, had doubts about the official nature of the 60c second type issue, and challenged the theories of the Uruguay collectors Dr Esteban Wonner

, Vasconcellos and Durante, who found copies in an old correspondence.
In 1892 Mr. Seijó had the opportunity to acquire the correspondence archive of Vicente Piñeiro of Rocha, and found three covers franked with the “Diligencia” second type, all emanating from the merchant Sopeña of Montevideo. This find was the definitive confirmation of the genuineness of this issue and its postal use, and brought to a close a conflict which had confronted European and Uruguayan chroniclers for nearly 20 years. Mr. Seijó sold them some years later to three collectors in Uruguay, among them Dr. José Marcó del Pont.

1859-1862 Soles de Montevideo
Satisfied with the results achieved with the Diligencia stamps, Mr. Lapido had a new series printed in 1858 for the franking of correspondence with the Republic of Argentina. This set came also in 3 values:
 120 centésimos blue
 180 centésimos green
 240 centésimos red
This issue came to be called Soles de Montevideo (Montevideo Suns) or Soles Doble Cifra (Block Type Issue), as the value of each stamp was also printed at the bottom of the stamp.

At the end of 1857, Mr. Lapido resigned from the post of Director and was replaced by Prudencio Echevarriarza, who continued the reforms of his predecessor, and presented a proposal to the government for the application of postal stamps for correspondence between every point in the country. This was approved by the government and was laid down in its decree of 11 June 1859.'

The first stamps with government approval were hence issued on 1 July 1859.

See also
Postage stamps and postal history of Uruguay
Uruguay
Stamps of Uruguay on Wikimedia Commons

References

Further reading
Hoffmann, Robert. Catalogo de las variedades mas importantes. 1948.
Kalckhoff F, Stenger E. Festschrift zur feier des 25 Jahrigen Bestehens des Berliner Philatelisten-Klub . Berlin, 1913. (Contains article on early issues of Uruguay).
Kobylanski J.K. and Casal Gari E. Documentos historico postales del correo en la Republica Oriental del Uruguay. Uruguay: Mundas, 1984.
 Dr. Kurchan, Mario D. Historia Postal Marítima del Río de la Plata: Uruguay. 1996. Awarded the Alvaro Bonilla Lara Medal in 1996 by the FIAF.
Lee, E.J. Uruguay, The Grand Prix Collection Formed by Mr. E. J. Lee. London: Plumridge & Co., 1936.
Lee, E.J. The Postage Stamps of Uruguay. London: Stanley Gibbons Limited, 1931.
Maassen, Wolfgang. 150 Jahre "Sonnen-Marken" aus Uruguay. Philatelie 354, December 2006, pp. 45–51.
Narath, Albert. Die Nummern-Zierstempel der Departamentos von Uruguay. Berlin, 1961
Rowe, Dennis Trevor. Catchpole, Paul. The Railways of South America. Arrow: P. Catchpole Ltd, 2000. 
Sigismond, Jean. Les Timbres de L'Uruguay. Paris: Editions Charles Mendel, 1908.

External links
  "Historia de la Filatelia: El Primer Sello de Correos en Uruguay", on line.   Official site of Correo Uruguayo – Filately
  Leon Norman Williams, "Uruguay’s Montevideo Suns", from Encyclopedia of Rare and Famous Stamps.  David Feldman, Geneva (1993).  On line.

Philately of Uruguay